Marla Kanelos (born December 15, 1968)  is an American television soap opera writer.

Positions held
All My Children
 Script Writer: March 8, 2005 - January 2, 2008
 Occasional Script Writer: 2004, 2005
 Associate Head Writer: June 4, 2004 - October 8, 2004

Days of Our Lives
 Writers' Assistant: 1990s

General Hospital
 Script Writer: 1998
 Production Coordinator: 1997 - 1998

Port Charles
 Associate Head Writer: 1998 - October 3, 2003
 Production Coordinator: 1997 - 1998

The Young and the Restless
 Associate Head Writer: April 11, 2008 - November 2, 2012 
 Writers' Assistant: 1990s

Wild Card
Script Writer: 2003

Awards and nominations
Writers Guild of America Award
Nomination, 2006, Best Writing, All My Children

References

External links

LA Times on Marla Kanelos and the WGA Strike

American soap opera writers
1968 births
Living people